The San Lorenzo march is an Argentine military march, whose lyrics celebrate the role played by the Regiment of Mounted Grenadiers commanded by José de San Martín at the Battle of San Lorenzo during the Argentine War of Independence. Special mention receives the heroic sergeant Juan Bautista Cabral. The music was composed in 1901 by Uruguayan musician Cayetano Alberto Silva, and the lyrics in 1908 by Carlos Javier Benielli. It was later incorporated into the musical repertoires of other military bands around the world.

Creation
On July 8, 1901, at his home in Venado Tuerto, Santa Fe, Cayetano Silva composed a march dedicated to José de San Martín. He did so following a proposal from Representative Celestino Pera. He initially considered naming it "San Martín", but he changed his mind and named it "San Lorenzo" instead. The Battle of San Lorenzo is the only battle that San Martín fought within the territory of modern Argentina. The city of San Lorenzo, where the battle was fought, was the birthplace of Pablo Ricchieri (the Argentine War Minister in 1901), and Silva dedicated the march to him.

The march was publicly performed for the first time on October 30, 1902, at the opening ceremony for the monument to General San Martín in Plaza San Martín (Rosario), in the presence of President Julio Argentino Roca and Ricchieri. His neighbor, Carlos Javier Benielli, added lyrics to the march in 1908, with a description of the battle and the role of Juan Bautista Cabral in it.

The march became famous in other countries over time and, according to the Argentine British Community Council, is currently considered in Europe one of the best five military marches ever written. The military bands of Uruguay, Brazil and Poland, among others, include it in their musical repertoire. It was played during the coronations of King George V and Elizabeth II, in 1911 and 1953 respectively, with prior approval sought by the British government from Argentina. In addition, the march is played during the changing of the guard at Buckingham Palace, although it was suspended during the Falklands War. It was also exchanged with the German army for their Alte Kameraden march, before World War II, and it was played in Paris during the German occupation of France during World War II as a result. The Supreme Allied Commander, General Dwight D. Eisenhower, sought to redress this by having it played during the entrance of the Allied army that liberated Paris after the successful Operation Overlord.

Lyrics

References

External links

 San Lorenzo official site - San Lorenzo march interpreted by Alejandro Lerner and María Elena Walsh

Argentine military marches
Cultural depictions of José de San Martín
1902 songs
Articles containing video clips
Songs about Argentina